Georgina Naidu is an Australian actress, stage writer and university lecturer. From Melbourne, she began acting from an early age and completed her professional training with the Victorian College of the Arts in 1994. She began her film career taking small roles, such as Mary in the 1998 film Dead Letter Office. Her television career has also been formed of many guest roles in Australian drama series. Her role as Phrani Gupta in the 1998 Australian Broadcasting Corporation drama SeaChange heightened her profile. The actress continued to play numerous roles in film and television over the two decades that followed. She also studied law and became a university lecturer.

Naidu has often concentrated on theatre work and has starred in many theatrical productions. She also writes plays and in 2005 she opened her one-woman show, Yellowfeather, at the Sydney Opera House. Her show is an autobiographical piece that focuses on her life and went on to tour internationally. In 2011, she appeared as Georgina in the drama At Home With Julia and the show's cast won an 2012 Equity Ensemble Award. In 2017, Naidu secured the main role of Helena Chatterjee in Newton's Law, which aired on the ABC network. Other ongoing roles included Marla in The Time of Our Lives and Toni Chadha in the drama series Playing for Keeps. In 2019, Naudi reprised her role in SeaChange and continued appearing in numerous Australian drama series.

Early life
Naidu is from Melbourne and has Anglo-Indian ancestry. Naidu has claimed that her family knew she wanted to act following an impromptu dance piece at the age of three. She took part in amateur acting from 1984 until 1991 with the St Martin's Youth Theatre in South Yarra, Victoria. Naidu went to the Victorian College of the Arts and graduated in 1994. She had also trained at Prahran College of Performing Arts in 1991. One of her early roles came in 1990, when she played an extra in the Paul Cox film Golden Braid. She later studied law at La Trobe University. When she first started attending auditions Naidu was shocked because she felt that casting directors were "pigeon holing" her because of her ethnicity. After her first year of auditioning she became passionate about trying to change things.

Career
Naidu has taken part in various theatre productions over her career in-between securing roles in television and film. Her television career began with small roles in the children's shows The Gift and Lift Off. Then came a guest role in the Australian drama series G.P. She soon gained a supporting role in the 1998 film Dead Letter Office as the office worker Mary. The actress also secured other guest roles in the late 1990s in the films Road to Nhill, Mallboy and the television series Blue Heelers.

In 1998, Naidu secured one of her most prominent television roles, playing Phrani Gupta in the Australian Broadcasting Corporation drama SeaChange. The role made her a favourite with viewers. Naidu liked the role because Phrani is not a clichéd Indian woman, adding that "[Phrani] is industrious, has good business sense and can turn her hand to anything." At the time Australian actors organised a strike over pay disputes. Her SeaChange co-star Kevin Harrington claimed that Naidu had been underpaid by those in charge of the programme.

Following SeaChange Naidu secured guest roles in Blue Heelers, Stingers, Guinevere Jones and Something in the Air. She appeared in six more theatrical productions during 2003 and 2004. She then played various roles in the Belvoir production of Run Rabbit Run, at the Belvoir St Theatre, Sydney, and continued to pursue on camera work, taking a role in legal and medical drama MDA and acted in the short film Tackle.

Naidu also writes theatre productions. On 20 September 2005, her autobiographical play Yellowfeather opened at the Sydney Opera House. It was delivered as a one-woman show and featured Naidu documenting her life with a comedic tone. The full stage production toured around Australia and then internationally. The following year she appeared in Gorkem Acaroglu's live stage documentary The Habib Show.

In the ten years that followed, Naidu continued to secure guest roles on various Australian television series including Tripping Over, Satisfaction, City Homicide, Mr & Mrs Murder, The Time of Our Lives, Winners & Losers and The Beautiful Lie. She also played Paula in the 2009 film  The Boys Are Back. That year she also returned to the theatrical stage for The Melbourne Town Players production of Attract/Repel. In 2011, she appeared in the ABC1 drama At Home With Julia as Georgina. The show's cast won a 2012 Equity Ensemble Award for "Outstanding Performance by an Ensemble Cast in a Television Comedy Series". 2013 saw her return to theatre with the stage tour of Ganesh Versus The Third Reich.

In 2016, Naidu guest starred in Offspring, Wentworth and Please Like Me. That year in August it was announced that Naidu had secured the main role of Helena Chatterjee in Newton's Law and had begun filming. The series debuted on 9 February 2017 on the ABC network and it was created by Deb Cox, who also created SeaChange. Also in 2017, she took another main theatre role in Lally Katz's production Minnie & Liraz and made a guest appearance in the season finale of Rosehaven, playing Jocelyn. She also had a part portraying a university lecturer in the film Ali's Wedding. Naidu secured the supporting role of Toni Chadha in the 2018 Network Ten drama series Playing for Keeps. She then made a guest appearance in an episode of Network Ten's How to Stay Married.

In 2019, Naidu reprised her role as Phrani Gupta for a new series of SeaChange. 2021 saw Naidu play several roles on Australian television. She played Alison Chen in ABC's drama series Harrow, Alice Pike in ABC's comedy Fisk and Prisha Kapoor in the Netflix mini-series Clickbait. She then took on the role of school teacher Mrs Allen in Paramount+ comedy drama Spreadsheet. In 2022, she took on the role of Aunty Barb in SBS drama, A Beginner's Guide to Greif.

Naidu is a member of the Main Stage Green Room Panel which helps recognise talent in theatre productions and a member of the Media, Entertainment and Arts Alliance Equity Diversity Committee. She also works as a university lecturer and legal researcher.

Filmography

Sources:

References

External links
 

Living people
20th-century Australian actresses
21st-century Australian actresses
Australian television actresses
Year of birth missing (living people)
Actresses from Melbourne